Anopinella granadana is a species of moth of the family Tortricidae. It is found in Peru.

The wingspan is 22.5 mm. The ground colour of the forewings is whitish, suffused with brownish rust and with rows of darker spots along the middle of the interfasciae. The hindwings are brownish white, suffused brownish grey on the periphery.

Etymology
The species name refers to the name of the type locality, Granada, Peru.

References

Moths described in 2010
Anopinella
Moths of South America
Taxa named by Józef Razowski